Uwe Unterwalder (born 15 July 1950) is a retired East German track cyclist. He had his best achievements in the 4000 m individual and team pursuit. In these disciplines he won two silver medal at the 1972 and 1980 Summer Olympics, as well as six medals at the world championships in 1971–1978; his team finished in fourth place at the 1976 Summer Olympics.

References

1950 births
Living people
East German male cyclists
Olympic cyclists of East Germany
Cyclists at the 1972 Summer Olympics
Cyclists at the 1976 Summer Olympics
Cyclists at the 1980 Summer Olympics
Olympic medalists in cycling
Olympic silver medalists for East Germany
Cyclists from Berlin
Medalists at the 1972 Summer Olympics
Medalists at the 1980 Summer Olympics
People from East Berlin